Banalinga, a stone found in nature, in the bed of the Narmada river in Madhya Pradesh state, India, is an iconic symbol of worship, based on either the scriptures or cultural traditions among the Hindus, particularly of the Shaivaites and Smartha Brahmins. Stones are ancient and connote divinity. It is a smooth ellipsoid stone. 

Banalinga is also called the Svayambhu Linga: (Sanskrit) "Self-existent mark or sign of God", as it is discovered in nature and not carved or crafted by human hands.

The forms of Linga can vary in detail from a simple roller shape roughly cylindrical Banalinga to the stone carved with a thousand facets (Sahasralinga) or of light relief in several human figures (Mukhalinga).  The Linga in the shrine of a temple is in stone.

The Narmada Shivling are quite strong and the hardness is a 7 on the Mohs scale.

Significance 

The Narmada River (also called the Rewa, from its leaping motion (from the root rev through its rocky bed) where the Banalinga stones are found, has been mentioned by Ptolemy and the author of the Periplus. The Ramayana, the Mahabharata and Puranas refer to it frequently. The Rewa Khand of Vayu Purana and the Rewa Khand of Skanda Purana are entirely devoted to the story of the birth and the importance of the Narmada River. It is said to have sprung from the body of Lord Shiva. It was created in the form of a lovely damsel who enamoured gods and hence named by the Lord as Narmada – delight giving. It is, therefore, often called Shankari, i.e., daughter of Lord Shankar (Shiva).

All the pebbles rolling on its bed are said to take the shape of His emblem with the saying Narmada Ke Kanker utte Sanka (which is a popular saying in the Hindi belt of India) which means that ‘pebble stones of Narmada gets a personified form of Shiva’. Thus, these lingam shaped stones, called Banalinga are sought after for daily worship by the Hindus.

The Bannalinga, as a divine aniconic symbol for worship, is held in reverence by the Shaivaites and Smartha Brahmins, to the same extent as the Saligrama Sila (murti) is held in reverence by the Vaishnavites.

Further, a sighting of the Narmada River is considered equivalent to a bath in the Ganges. At numerous places along its course there are temples, and fairs are held. Pilgrims perform Pradakshina (circumambulation), i.e., walking along the southern bank from its source to the mouth and going back along the northern bank. The performance is regarded to be of the highest religious efficacy.

Three kinds of lingas are described in the Brihat Vaivarta Purana (Hindu scripture). It is said that  gives salvation, the  gives [worldly] happiness, and  gives both happiness and salvation.

People belonging to various Hindu sects such as Shaiva, Kapalik, Gosavi, Virashaiva, etc., use various lingas – earthen (parthivlinga), lingas in a silver box donned around the neck (kanthasthalinga), lingas of crystal glass (sphatiklinga), banalingas, a five stringed linga (panchasutri), stone lingas (pashanlinga), etc.

Panchayatana 
Banalinga is a part of the fivefold family of deities (Panchayatana). The five Hindu deities (Shiva, Vishnu, Devi, Surya and Ganesha) are the embodiment of 5 bhutas/tatwas worshipped in formless stones, which are obtained from the 5 rivers as indicated in the table below. Panchayatana form of worship is said to have been introduced by Adi Shankara, the 8th century C.E Hindu philosopher, to enable a person to worship his Ishta devata (adored or desired deity), to address each sectarian form of worship and thus bring about tolerance among all sects.  Depending on the tradition followed by Smarta households, one of these deities is kept in the centre facing East direction and the other four are arranged in four corners surrounding it, as indicated in the diagram below; all the deities are worshipped with equal fervor and devotion.

         	
People generally sit facing East, while placing the deities/devatas and performing the Panchayatana pooja in the following order:

A layout for performing the Panchayatana Pooja

In an additional form of worship, called the Shanmata, also founded by Adi Shankara, six deities are worshipped; the sixth deity in addition to the five deities referred in Panchayatana pooja referred above, is Skanda also known as Kartikeya and Murugan.

Thanjavur Temple
The famous Thanjavur Brihadeeswarar Temple has one of the biggest Banalingas.

See also 
 Panchayatana puja
 Shanmata

References 

Objects used in Hindu worship
Stones